Polypeptide N-acetylgalactosaminyltransferase 13 is an enzyme that in humans is encoded by the GALNT13 gene.

The GALNT13 protein is a member of the UDP-N-acetyl-alpha-D-galactosamine:polypeptide N-acetylgalactosaminyltransferase (GalNAcT; EC 2.4.1.41) family, which initiate O-linked glycosylation of mucins (see MUC3A, MIM 158371) by the initial transfer of N-acetylgalactosamine (GalNAc) with an alpha-linkage to a serine or threonine residue.[supplied by OMIM]

References

Further reading